Matairesinol is an organic compound. It is classified as a lignan, i.e., a type of phenylpropanoid. It is present in some cereals, e.g. rye, and together with Secoisolariciresinol, has attracted much attention for its beneficial nutritional effects.

Metabolism
The plant lignans are precursors of the enterolignans (mammalian lignans). A number of plant lignans are metabolized to the enterolignans (enterodiol and enterolactone) that can potentially reduce the risk of certain cancers and cardiovascular diseases.

Biomedical considerations
Although some studies attribute disease preventative (cardio-protective and hormone associated cancers like breast cancer) benefits of lignans, the results are inconclusive. Matairesinol has been found to act as an agonist of the adiponectin receptor 1 (AdipoR1).

References 

Adiponectin receptor agonists
Lignans
Lactones
Tetrahydrofurans
Phenols
Phenol ethers